Thomas Edur  (born Toomas Edur; 20 January 1969) is an Estonian former ballet dancer, and the artistic director of Estonian National Ballet.

Edur was born in Tallinn. He is a graduate of Tallinn Ballet School in 1988. From 1990 to 2009, he was a principal dancer with the English National Ballet (ENB).

Edur was married to fellow former ENB dancer Age Oks. Oks is also Estonian, and is professionally known as Agnes Oaks.

References

1969 births
Living people
Commanders of the Order of the British Empire
Estonian male ballet dancers
English National Ballet principal dancers
Estonian expatriates in the United Kingdom
People from Tallinn